Padang Lawas is a regency in North Sumatra province of Indonesia. It covers an area of 3,912.18 km2, and had a population of 226,807 at the 2010 Census and 261,011 at the 2020 Census. Its administrative seat is the town of Sibuhuan. Padang Lawas Regency formerly included the area and population of present-day North Padang Lawas Regency, which has subsequently been separated.

Administrative districts
At the 2010 Census, the regency was divided into nine districts (kecamatan). Subsequently, three additional districts were created by the division of existing districts (Barumun Selatan created from part of Barumun District; Aek Nabara Barumun and Sihapas Barumun from parts of Barumun Tengah). In 2019 a further five districts were created, although the populations of these areas at the 2010 Census are still included in the districts from which they were cut. The districts are tabulated below with their areas and their populations at the 2010 Census and the 2020 Census. The table also includes the locations of the district administrative centres, the number of administrative villages (desa and kelurahan) in each district and its post code.

Notes: (a) the 2010 Census populations of the new Barumun Baru District is included in the figure for the Barumun District, from which it was cut out in 2019.
(b) the 2010 Census populations of the new Sosa Julu and Ulu Sosa Districts are included in the figure for the Sosa District, from which they were cut out in 2019.
(c) the 2010 Census populations of the new Sosa Timur District is included in the figures for the Batang Lubu Sutam and Hutaraja Tinggi Districts, from which it was cut out in 2019.(d) the 2010 Census populations of the new Barumun Barut District is included in the figure for the Barumun Tengah District, from which it was cut out in 2019.

Archaeology

The Padang Lawas archaeological site is partly located in the regency. Covering approximately 1,500 km² it spreads over the districts of Barumun and Barumun Tengah, and into South Tapanuli and North Padang Lawas regencies.

References

Regencies of North Sumatra